Mikko Matti Mäkelä (born February 28, 1965) is a Finnish former professional ice hockey left wing. Known as the "Flying Finn", he was drafted in the fourth round, 65th overall, by the New York Islanders in the 1983 NHL Entry Draft.

Mäkelä made his NHL debut with the Islanders in the 1985–86 season.  In four-plus seasons with the Islanders, Mäkelä scored 95 goals, including 37 in the 1987–88 season.  The Islanders traded Mäkelä to the Los Angeles Kings during the 1989–90 season in exchange for Hubie McDonough and Ken Baumgartner.

After finishing the 1989–90 season with Los Angeles, Mäkelä was traded again before the 1990–91 season.  This time, he went to the Buffalo Sabres in exchange for Mike Donnelly.  After one season in Buffalo, Mäkelä returned to Europe, spending two-plus seasons playing in his native Finland and one in Sweden.

Mäkelä returned to the NHL following the 1994–95 NHL lockout, appearing in 11 games with the Boston Bruins during the shortened 1994–95 season.  Mäkelä returned to Europe for the remainder of his career, playing two seasons in Germany's Deutsche Eishockey Liga before returning to Sweden and Finland for his final two seasons.

Mäkelä appeared in 423 NHL games in his career, scoring 118 goals and adding 147 assists.  He also appeared in 18 Stanley Cup playoff games, scoring three goals and recording eight assists.

Since retiring from professional hockey, Mäkelä has moved to Lethbridge, Alberta, where he and his family currently reside.

Mäkelä served as the head coach for the Lethbridge Hurricanes of the Western Hockey League. With the hiring, Mäkelä was the first European born and bred head coach in the history of the Canadian Hockey League. Mäkelä would be relieved of his duties on January 13, 2004 and replaced by former London Knights head coach Lindsay Hofford.

He currently works at the Warner Hockey School, a private girls' school located in Warner, Alberta where he serves as both Head Coach and Director of Hockey Operations of the Warner Hockey School Warriors girls' hockey team of the Junior Women's Hockey League.

Career statistics

Regular season and playoffs

International

References

External links

Warner Hockey School - Staff
Junior Women's Hockey League - Warner School

1965 births
Boston Bruins players
Buffalo Sabres players
Düsseldorfer EG players
Finnish ice hockey left wingers
Ilves players
Lethbridge Hurricanes coaches
Living people
Los Angeles Kings players
Malmö Redhawks players
New York Islanders draft picks
New York Islanders players
Ice hockey people from Tampere
Providence Bruins players
Södertälje SK players
Springfield Indians players
Tappara players
HC TPS players
Olympic bronze medalists for Finland
Olympic ice hockey players of Finland
Ice hockey players at the 1992 Winter Olympics
Ice hockey players at the 1994 Winter Olympics
Olympic medalists in ice hockey
Medalists at the 1994 Winter Olympics